Crochat was a French railway equipment construction company founded in 1899 by Henry Crochat. It is best known for building locomotives and railcars with petrol-electric transmission.

History 
Reference
 1899 - Company founded by Henry Crochat
 1908 to 1918 - Construction of 420 petrol-electric locomotives for le Ministère de la Guerre (Ministry of War) and a small number for other customers. See table below for details
 1924 - Acquisition of patents by Decauville
 1926 - Foundation of Société Auxiliaire d'Entreprise (SAE) by Henry Crochat
 1928 - Company liquidated

Locomotive types
Petrol-electric locomotive types
This is not a complete list.

Crochat and Colardeau
Henry Crochat obtained some patents jointly with Emmanuel Colardeau, e.g. patent US1416611.  There is no evidence that Colardeau was involved in Crochat's railway business but he may have been involved, with Crochat, in the design of the Saint-Chamond (tank).

Equipment preserved
 Crochat AT1 petrol-electric railcar (1922) from Tramway de Pithiviers à Toury preserved at Musée des transports de Pithiviers
 Five Crochat 6-axle locomotives of 1918 (ex Salins du Midi) preserved at Chemin de fer touristique du Tarn. One of these is a historical monument
  Decauville-Crochat AT3 petrol-electric railcar (1926) preserved at Le p'tit train de Saint-Trojan
 Crochat standard gauge locomotive 44 L 4 N preserved at the Museum of Engineering in Angers (not on public view)

References

Defunct locomotive manufacturers of France